Bandlaguda Jagir is a satellite city of Hyderabad and a municipal corporation in Rangareddy district, Telangana, India. It Falls Under Gandipet mandal of Rajendranagar revenue division. It recently upgraded to a municipal corporation.

This village was merged into HMDA. It is 8 km from Mehdipatnam Junction. This area is connected to the outer ring road at TSPA Junction, from where Rajiv Gandhi International Airport is just 20 km and Gachibowli IT zone is just 14 km. There is much construction in this area. Recent ventures include Bhavani Colony, Maple Town Villas, PBEL City, Giridhari Executive Park, ISOLA, Keerthi Sunrise, Vasathi Anandi and SMR Harmony.

Bandlaguda Jagir area falls under Don Bosco Nagar Post Office (Pincode: 500086) and Rajendranagar and Narsingi Police Stations under Cyberabad.

Suncity, a suburb inside Bandlaguda, is a retail hub. Time school, Army Public School, Glendale Academy, SMP Model High School, and Shadan Institute of Medical Sciences are here.

Bandlaguda Jagir Village is surrounded by the smaller villages of Kismatpur, Sikanderguda, Gandamguda, Hydershakote, and Peerancheruvu.

It is one of the largest villages under Gandipet Mandal. It is near the picturesque Himayat Sagar and Osman Sagar freshwater lakes and Mrugavani National Park which covers an area of about 700 acres. The Esi and Musi rivulets are nearby.

The road from Bandlaguda Crossroads to Kismatpur is being extended with two-way lanes.

Temples 
Aarra Maisamma Temple a.k.a. Kali Temple
Bhavani matha Temple (Bhavani Colony) 
Mahankali Temple (old village)
Anjaneya Swamy Temple (old village)
Pochamma Temple (old village)
Mallanna Temple (Prasanthnagar Colony)
Sai Baba Temple (Vikas Nagar Colony)
Vinayaka Temple
Lakshmi Narashima Swamy Temple (Sun City)
Asta Lakshmi Temple (Main Road)
Hanuman Temple (opposite government school in Kalika Nagar)
Vaishnavi Devi Devalayam (P&T Colony)
Yellama Temple (Indus Valley)
 Rama Temple, Raghuram Nagar

Mosques 
 Masjid-e-Khatijatul Kubra
 Masjid-Al-Mu'min
 Masjid-e-Zaibunnisa
 Masjid-e-Ibrahim sarwari
 Masjid-e-Osman
 Masjid-e-Alamgir
 Masjid-e-Fatima
 Masjid Al Geelan
 Jama Masjid-e-Qadria, Ahlesunnat wal jamat.

Schools 
Glendale Academy 
Kangaroo Kids-Suncity-Best preschool
Kids Kastle Play School 
Kinderland Preschool 
EUROKIDS Hydershahkote Pre school 
Baalyam Pre-School & Daycare 
Learning Einsteins (play school, daycare. Nursery Teachers training)
Little Angels School (daycare, nursery, LKG & UKG)
Millennium Activity Center India (MAC 9) for day care and children's learning programs
Kidzee Pre School & Daycare 
Rau's High School
Small Wonders Play School 
T.I.M.E. School
Living Bridge Montessori School (Suncity) 
OAKRIDGE International's Oi Playschool
Don Bosco School (CBSE)
Archangels High School
Army Public School
Pristine Public School
SSV Talent School
NRI Global high school
MATES Academy for Early Childhood Education & Development Studies
Global Discovery Academy
IQ Academy (Ladies Islamic Studies / Distance Education)
L.N.R. high school
Academic Heights Public school and Bachpan Play school
SMP Model High School (SSC & CBSE)
Sri Saraswathi Shishumandir
Kids preschool
Kangaroo Kids-Suncity/best preschool

Banks & ATMs 
State Bank of India & ATM
Bank of Baroda
Canara Bank & ATM
Allahabad Bank
Union Bank of India & ATM
HDFC Bank & ATM
Telangana Grameena Bank & ATM
ICICI Bank
Axis Bank & ATMs

Places of interest
Order Gift - Customized Gifts Store (Gift Shop) [0.5 km,5 minutes]
Sri Raghavendra Sports Estate (cricket ground) [0.5 km,5 minutes]
Mcube Attapur (mall, Masthi and multiplex) [5 km, 15 minutes]
Mantra Mall (Cinepolis) Upperpally [3 km, 15 minutes]
Chilkur Balaji Temple [12 km] from Kali Mandir
Himayat Sagar Fresh Water Lake [3.9 km, 5minutes]
Osman Sagar a.k.a. Gandipet Fresh Water Lake [10 km, 15 minutes]
Telangana State Police Academy (TSPA) [3.3 km, 5 minutes]
Sangam [4.3 km, 7 minutes]
Ocean Park – Theme Park [10.6 km, 15 minutes]
Prof. Jayashankar Agricultural University [3.9 km, 8 minutes]
Shadan Medical College [1.9 km, 4minutes]
Shadan College of Engg. & Technology [1.9 km, 4 minutes]
Kali Temple [1.2 km, 2 minutes]
Golkonda Fort [5.3 km, 12 minutes]
Taramati Baradari [5.6 km, 8 minutes]
Tippu Khan bridge [3 km, 7 minutes]
BK Cricket Academy
Millennium Activity Center India (MAC 9) - children's learning programs
Syed Malang Shah Vali Dargah

Street Names 
Srinivasa Nagar Colony
Bhavani Colony
Adarsh Nagar Colony
Abyudaya Nagar Colony
Arunodhaya Nagar Colony
Anand Enclave 
Akbar Colony
Bank Colony
Balaji Colony
Bharathi Nagar Colony
Diamond Valley Colony
Doctors Colony
DurgaDevi (DD) Colony
Dwaraka Nagar Colony
Feel Good Homes Colony
Green Valley Association Colony
Gayatrinagar Colony
Hyder Enclave
Indus valley gandamguda
Indra Reddy Nagar Colony
Kalika Nagar Colony
KK Nagar Phase-2 Colony
KK Nagar Phase-3
Mallikarjuna Colony
Machanpally Enclave
N.F.C Colony
Shiva Ganga Phase -1 P.S. Colony
Om Nagar Colony
P&T Colony
Padmasri Hills
Prashanth Nagar Colony
Radhanagar
Sairam Colony
Midcity 
Sandhya Nagar Colony
Satya Enclave (Green Avenue Welfare Association)
Shirdi SaiBaba colony
Shanthi Nagar Colony
Madhavi Nagar Colony
Subhan Colony – 1
Subhan Colony – 2
Suncity
Suryodaya Colony
Venkateshwara Colony
Vikas Nagar Colony
Vinayak Nagar Colony
Westend Colony
Yadav Mitra Colony
Vaishali Nagar
Vishwasnagar
Anand Nagar
Krishna Nagar
Sirimalli Vihar
Brundhavan Colony
Amrutha Avenue
Abyudha Nagar
Tirumala Gardens
Manasa Hills
Defense Colony
Narsareddy Colony
Sri Veerabramendra Colony
Saraswati Nagar
Harishitha Huda Colony
Saibaba Colony
Syed Nagar Colony
Bhavani Colony
Sangam City
Shiva Sai Nagar Colony, Bairagiguda
Sai Valmiki Nagar Residential Welfare Association
Karywell Homes
Sarvari Lane & Residents Welfare Association.
Sri Vigneshwara Colony Welfare Society

Residential communities 
Srinivasa Nagar Colony
Bhavani Colony
Avedh Avenue
Ashok Vihar Residency
Taiba Residency
Maple Town Villas
Pragathi Homes
Richmond Villas
 Rosewood Mansion 
Pavani Harmony
Saadat Enclave
SMP
SM Enclave
Siri Enclave Villas
Libdom Villas
 Sri Vigneshwara Colony Welfare Society
 Wood Hill Fort View Apartment
 SMR Enclave, Himayathsagar village
 Vaishnavi Oasis
 Vaishnavi Houdini - Mega Residential Gated Community
 Rosewood Mansion
 Kendriya Vihar Phase-III
 Sai Shakti Symphony
 Jains Salzburg Towers

Transport 
Bandlaguda Jagir falls on Atrial Road connecting Outer Ring Road (TSPA Junction) to Nanal Nagar (Mehdipatnam). All the buses going to Chevella, Vikarabad, and Chilkur stop here.

Bus No 188/251 from Mehdipatnam to Shamshabad (direct), Bus No:5/188 (Secunderabad-Kalimandir), 288 (all village buses like Chevella, Vikarabad, Parigi) and 288D (Chilukuru Balaji Temple buses) from Mehdipatnam to Bandlaguda X Roads stop.

OLA, Uber, and Rapido are present.

References

External links
1. https://telanganatoday.com/star-maa-mahotsavam-held-at-bandlaguda-jagir

2.  https://www.magicbricks.com/property-for-sale-in-bandlaguda-jagir-hyderabad-pppfs

Villages in Ranga Reddy district